Ulf Bengtsson (26 January 1960 – 17 March 2019) was a Swedish table tennis player and coach.

From 1983 to 1988 he won several medals in singles, doubles, and team events at the European Championships, two silver medals with the Swedish team in the World Table Tennis Championships, he also achieved the third place at the Table Tennis World Cup in 1984.

See also
 List of table tennis players

References

External links 
 Ulf Bengtsson among famous Swedish table tennis players and coaches

1960 births
2019 deaths
Swedish male table tennis players
Swedish table tennis coaches
People from Höganäs Municipality
Sportspeople from Skåne County